Ichkeria can refer to:

 The historical name for a region encompassing the highlands of eastern Chechnya, see History of Chechnya#Ichkeria
 Chechen Republic of Ichkeria, the secessionist government of Chechnya

See also
 Chechen (disambiguation)